Sainte-Eulalie-d'Olt (Languedocien: Senta Aulària d'Òlt) is a commune in the department of Aveyron in southern France. It is one of the Les Plus Beaux Villages de France (most beautiful villages of France).

See also
Communes of the Aveyron department

References

Communes of Aveyron
Plus Beaux Villages de France
Aveyron communes articles needing translation from French Wikipedia